The weightlifting competitions at the 2022 Bolivarian Games took place in the Polideportivo Colegio Andrés Escobar Court in Valledupar, Colombia from 1 to 5 July 2022.

Participating nations

 (host)

Medal table

Results

Medalists
Men

Women

References

Bolivarian Games
2022 Bolivarian Games
2022 Bolivarian Games